Twice Married is a 1930 German comedy film directed by E. W. Emo and starring Liane Haid, Ralph Arthur Roberts, and Lucie Englisch.

The film's sets were designed by the art director Emil Hasler.

Cast

References

Bibliography

External links

1930 films
1930 comedy films
German comedy films
Films of the Weimar Republic
1930s German-language films
Films directed by E. W. Emo
Cine-Allianz films
German black-and-white films
1930s German films